Shirak Avia LLC is an Armenian carrier based at Zvartnots International Airport in Yerevan, Armenia.

History
Originally founded in 2019, the company purchased a Boeing 737-500 aircraft, which is now leased to Armenia Airways since December 2020. In March 2022, Shirak Avia leased a Boeing 737-800 which is due to be delivered. The airline has announced plans to commence its own scheduled passenger operations beginning on 14 July 2022 to Moscow's Vnukovo International Airport.

Destinations

Fleet
The Shirak Avia fleet consists of the following aircraft (as of May 2022):

See also
 List of airlines of Armenia
 List of airports in Armenia
 List of the busiest airports in Armenia
 Transport in Armenia

References

External links
 Facebook page

Airlines of Armenia
Airlines established in 2016
Armenian companies established in 2016
Transport in Yerevan